Arthur Le Clerq was a British songwriter from the 1930s, responsible for several, mainly novelty, hits. These included:

 "Is Izzy Azzy Woz?" (1929)
 "The Rocket Bus" (1929) - also known as "Alf's Carpet"
 "He Played His Ukulele as the Ship Went Down" (1931) - recorded by Clinton Ford (also known as "The Wreck of the Nancy Lee"); also recorded by Leslie Sarony.
 "Tan Tan-Tivvy Tally Ho!" (1931) - recorded by George Formby and Billy Cotton
 "Nobody Loves a Fairy When She's Forty" (1934) - recorded by Tessie O'Shea
 "There's Another Trumpet Playing In The Sky" - recorded by Jenny Howard
 " She’s One of the Back Row Girls", broadcast and recorded by Miss Effie Atherton

References

External links
 National Library of Australia

British songwriters
Year of birth missing
Year of death missing